Mark Daniel Read (born in Worcester Park, London on 7 November 1978) is an English singer/songwriter, best known as member of the boy band A1 from 1998 to 2002, and 2009 to the present.

Background
Read grew up in a very musical family; his father Keith was in The Wild Angels, a rock 'n' roll band. His mother, Pam, played piano and drums as well as being a singer/songwriter. Read began playing piano at the age of two and eventually joined the family band on keyboards at the age of 11, where he would regularly perform in pubs, clubs and hotels across the country.

He attended Auriol Junior School and then went on to Epsom and Ewell High School.

At the age of 15, Read joined the Songtime Theatre Arts group, where he received training and gained experience in acting. He subsequently took lead roles in several of their productions, including Guys and Dolls and Aladdin.

Between the ages of 15 and 18, Read – along with his parents' band – performed onboard several P&O and Princess cruise ships. These concerts led took him all around the world, including aboard the liner Canberra as part of the D-Day 50th Anniversary Fleet in 1994.

In 2009, he performed A1's hit version of the A-ha song "Take On Me" at Saint Edmund's Catholic School in Dover, Kent and also The Astor of Hever Community School in Maidstone, Kent

A1
By the age of 19, Read was spotted at a music venue in Covent Garden, London, by Tim Byrne (manager of UK pop act Steps). At the time, Byrne was looking for suitable members to form a new pop group. It was through this chance encounter that Read went on to receive his first big break, as he would become one of the four members of the chart-topping band A1.

Along with band mates Ben Adams, Christian Ingebrigtsen and Paul Marazzi, Read achieved great success across the globe with A1, including two UK numbers 1 singles, 8 top ten hits, 3 studio albums and a Brit Award for Best Newcomer in 2001. Their first number 1 came with their cover of the A-ha song "Take On Me" and was soon followed by the self-penned "Same Old Brand New You".

It was announced in 2009 that A1 would reform to compete to represent Norway in the Eurovision Song Contest 2010. They came second in the final, losing out to Didrik Solli-Tangen.

Solo career
After A1 disbanded in 2002, Read focused on his songwriting and signed a publishing deal with Metrophonic Music, part of the Universal Music Publishing Group.

During this time, he earned the opportunity to collaborate with a number of diverse and well respected writers and artists including Rick Astley, John Barrowman, Joe Brown, Sam Brown, Charlotte Church, Jarvis Cocker, Roger Cook, Jason Donovan, Rob Davis, Robin Gibb, The Hollies, Kenney Jones, Ronan Keating, Lee Mead, Dennis Morgan, Denny Randell, Graham Stack, Mark Taylor and several UK X Factor finalists. In 2009, he made an appearance at St' Edmunds Catholic School, Dover, Kent performing his first number one hit from when he was a member of A1, "Take on Me".

In March 2009, Read was invited to appear at the Tesco Mum of the Year Awards, where he performed the self-penned track "Greatest Lady in My Life". The song was inspired by his friend's mother and was released as a download single. On 15 June 2009, Read released his debut album, entitled Peace at Last.

In 2013, he joined Extreme Robots, acting as co-presenter for their live shows across the UK which at the time used the Robot Wars brand. As of 2022 he also produces music for their live shows. 

From December 2015 to January 2016 he played Dandini in Cinderella at the Pavilion Theatre in Worthing.

On 20 December 2017, the launch of Robert J. Sherman's A Spoonful of Sherman UK/Ireland tour was announced. On the 25 city tour, Read was a featured performer alongside Sophie-Louise Dann, Glen Facey and Jenna Innes and Ben Stock.

From December 2022 to January 2023 he played Prince Louis in Jack and the Beanstalk at the Pavilion Theatre in Worthing.

Discography
 with A1
 Here We Come (1999)
 The A list (2000)
 Make It Good (2002)
 A1 (U.S. E.P.) (2002)
 The Best of a1 (2004)
 Greatest Hits (2009)
 Waiting for Daylight (2010)
 Rediscovered (2012)
 Solo
 Peace at Last (2009)

References

External links
Official website
Myspace page

1978 births
Living people
English male singers
English pop singers
English songwriters
A1 (band) members
Singers from London